Vaddukoddai Hindu College ( Vaṭṭukkōṭṭai Intuk Kallūri, also known as Vaddu Hindu College) is a provincial school in Sithankerny near Vaddukoddai, Sri Lanka.

See also
 List of schools in Northern Province, Sri Lanka

References

Provincial schools in Sri Lanka
Schools in Jaffna District